Leptidea amurensis is a butterfly of the family Pieridae. It is found from western Siberia to the Ussuri region and in North Korea, China, Mongolia and Japan.

The larvae feed on Hedysarum ussuriense, Lupinus species and Vicia amoena.

Subspecies
Leptidea amurensis amurensis
Leptidea amurensis emisinapis (Altai, Sayan, Transbaikalia)
Leptidea amurensis jacutia (Yakutia)
Leptidea amurensis japana

External links

Species info

Leptidea
Butterflies described in 1859
Taxa named by Édouard Ménétries